Spokane Falls Community College (SFCC) is a public community college in Spokane, Washington. It was established in 1967 and is part of the Community Colleges of Spokane.

History
The land upon which SFCC is located was given to the city after the U.S. Government declared Fort George Wright to be surplus. In 1960, it was proposed that a college be built upon the site. Seven years later, in 1967, SFCC was established on the site as part of Spokane Community College, which had been established across town in the Chief Garry Park neighborhood four years prior. In 1970, the two campuses split into separate colleges, though they maintain a cooperative approach.

Campus

Located on what was once Fort George Wright, a U.S. Army base from the late 1800s until the post-World War II era, in the West Hills neighborhood of Spokane. It is adjacent to the U.S. Campus of Mukogawa Women's University, which unlike SFCC has retained the historic buildings from the Fort Wright days. Both campuses are located on a relatively flat tableland surrounded by a bend in the Spokane River, which cuts a deep ridge to the south, east and north. The Spokane River Centennial Trail runs along the river on the northern edge of campus. The campus is home to about two dozen buildings used for education, most of which are clustered together with grass areas and walkways between them, though some are located among the parking lots which surround the center of campus.

Athletics
SFCC partners with Spokane Community College as the Community Colleges of Spokane, using the team name the Sasquatch. They compete in the Northwest Athletic Conference (NWAC). The official colors are blue and gold.

Notable alumni
Sharon Calahan, director of photography for films including A Bug's Life, Toy Story 2, and Finding Nemo
Dan O'Brien, Olympic athlete
Myles Kennedy, musician and songwriter
Todd Mcfarlane, comic book writer

References

External links

 
 Spokane Falls Community College history at HistoryLink

Community colleges in Washington (state)
Universities and colleges in Spokane, Washington
Educational institutions established in 1967
Universities and colleges accredited by the Northwest Commission on Colleges and Universities